Local elections were held in Baringo County on 4 March 2013 to elect a Governor and County Assembly. Under the new constitution, which was passed in a 2010 referendum, the 2013 general elections were the first in which Governors and members of the County Assemblies for the newly created counties were elected.

Gubernatorial election

Prospective candidates
The following are some of the candidates who have made public their intentions to run:
 Kiprono Chelugui 
 Ben Cheboi
 Stanley Kiptis

References

 

2013 local elections in Kenya